The Rainbow Cheetah a South African ultralight and light-sport aircraft, designed by Vladimir Chechin and produced by Rainbow Aircraft. The aircraft is supplied as a kit for amateur construction or as a complete ready-to-fly-aircraft.

Design and development
The aircraft was derived from the Best Off Skyranger and designed to comply with Canadian Advanced Ultralight criteria and the US light-sport aircraft rules. It features a strut-braced high-wing, a two-seats-in-side-by-side configuration enclosed cockpit with optional doors for access, fixed tricycle landing gear or optionally conventional landing gear and a single engine in tractor configuration.

The aircraft is made from bolted-together aluminum tubing, with its flying surfaces covered in Dacron sailcloth. Standard engines available are the  Rotax 582 two-stroke, the  Rotax 912UL and the  Rotax 912ULS four-stroke powerplants.

The Cheetah XLS has been accepted by Transport Canada as an Advanced Ultralight as both a land plane and seaplane, powered by the Rotax 582 two-stroke, the Rotax 912UL, the Rotax 912ULS, the Verner VM133 and the  Jabiru 2200A engines.

Operational history
By August 2012 there were three Cheetahs on the Federal Aviation Administration registry and two on the Transport Canada Civil Aircraft Register.

Variants
Cheetah XLS
Current production model (2012) with tricycle landing gear.
Cheetah XLS Taildragger
Current production model (2012) with conventional landing gear.

Specifications (Cheetah XLS)

References

External links

2000s South African ultralight aircraft
Homebuilt aircraft
Light-sport aircraft
Single-engined tractor aircraft